Calamotropha shichito is a moth in the family Crambidae. It was described by Nobukatsu Marumo in 1931. It is found on Japan's Kyushu island and in China.

References

Crambinae
Moths described in 1931